This is a list of football clubs in Azerbaijan, sub-divided into leagues where known.

Azerbaijan Premier League 2013-14

Azerbaijan First Division 2013-14

AFFA Amateur League
FC Absheron
FK Masallı
FK Ganclarbirliyi Sumqayit
Djidir Shusha
Spartak Baku
FC Qarabag Khankendi
Nidzhat Mashtagi
Narzan Gadabay
Femida Bilasuvar
Kainat Sumqayit
Kavkaz Belokan
Mil Beylagan
Ayulduz Baku
Bayil Rovers
Neftchi ISM
Denizchi XDND
Adliyya Baku
Spartak Guba
Bailov Rovers

Azerbaijan
 
clubs
Football clubs